Homogeneous system:
 Homogeneous system of linear algebraic equations
 System of homogeneous differential equations
 System of homogeneous first-order differential equations
 System of homogeneous linear differential equations
  in physics